Moon Girl may refer to:

 Moon Girl (EC Comics), a superhero from the Golden Age of Comics; real name is Claire Lune.
 Moon Girl (Marvel Comics), a superhero from Marvel Comics and the partner of Devil Dinosaur; real name is Lunella "Nella" Lafayette.
 Moon Girl and Devil Dinosaur, a 2023 animated television series based on Marvel's comic.

See also
 Moongirl, a short film produced by Laika.